Hällefors is a locality and the seat of Hällefors Municipality, Örebro County, Sweden with 4,530 inhabitants in 2010.

References 

Municipal seats of Örebro County
Swedish municipal seats
Populated places in Örebro County
Populated places in Hällefors Municipality